Senator Sutton may refer to:

Billie Sutton (born 1984), South Dakota Senate
Dan Sutton (born 1970), South Dakota Senate
W. J. Sutton (1865–1940), Washington State Senate